Methodology: European Journal of Research Methods for the Behavioral and Social Sciences is a biannual peer-reviewed scientific journal covering social and behavioral science research methodology. It was established in 2005 from the merger of two other journals: Metodologia de las Ciencias del Comportamiento and Methods of Psychological Research-Online. It is published by Hogrefe Publishing on behalf of the European Association of Methodology, of which it is the official journal. The editors-in-chief are Jost Reinecke (University of Bielefeld) and José-Luis Padilla (University of Granada). According to the Journal Citation Reports, the journal has a 2016 impact factor of 1.143.

References

External links

Methodology
Multidisciplinary social science journals
Publications established in 2005
Hogrefe Publishing academic journals
Biannual journals